Moureia was erected as a moth genus by Ricardo N. Orfila and Nelida H. Rosisi in 1956. It is now considered by Butterflies and Moths of the World to be a synonym of Victrix Staudinger, 1879 and by Lepidoptera and Some Other Life Forms and The Global Lepidoptera Names Index to be a synonym of Bryophila Treitschke, 1825.

References

External links
Original description: "Nuwos nombres genérioos en Lepidoptera". Revista de la Sociedad Entomológica Argentina: 29. 

Acronictinae